The former Church of the Holy Spirit is an historic Roman Catholic church building located at 1099 Hesperides Road in Lake Wales, Florida. In 1989 it was sold by the local Catholic diocese to the City of Lake Wales. It is now the Lake Wales Cultural Center.

On August 31, 1990, it was added to the U.S. National Register of Historic Places.

External links

 Polk County listings at National Register of Historic Places
 Florida's Office of Cultural and Historical Programs
 Polk County listings
 Lake Wales Art Center
 The history of Holy Spirit Catholic Church, in Lake Wales, Florida

References

Buildings and structures in Lake Wales, Florida
Former Roman Catholic church buildings in Florida
National Register of Historic Places in Polk County, Florida
Churches on the National Register of Historic Places in Florida
Roman Catholic churches completed in 1927
20th-century Roman Catholic church buildings in the United States
Churches in Polk County, Florida
1927 establishments in Florida